Alraune, die Henkerstochter, genannt die rote Hanne (Alraune, the Hangman's Daughter, Named Red Hanna) is a 1918 silent science fiction horror film directed by Eugen Illés and Joseph Klein and starring Max Auzinger.  The film was produced by Luna-Film and distributed by Natural Film GmbH. The art direction was by Artur Günther.  Alraune, die Henkerstochter, genannt die rote Hanne was released in the US under the title Sacrifice.

Inspiration
Despite the title, this film has very little connection to the 1911 novel by Hanns Heinz Ewers, with the only reference being to the Mandrake root which plays a role in saving the dying child.  In contrast to the Hungarian film by the same name, and released the same year, an intact version can still be found at George Eastman International Museum of Photography and Film.

Plot
A doctor uses the sperm of a dead man to impregnate a prostitute. The resultant child then grows up only to turn against the man who created her.

Cast
In alphabetical order

References

External links 
 

1918 horror films
1910s science fiction horror films
Films of the German Empire
German black-and-white films
German silent feature films
German science fiction horror films
Films based on German novels
Films based on works by Hanns Heinz Ewers
1910s German films
1910s German-language films
Silent science fiction horror films